Henri Cain (11 October 1857 – 21 November 1937) was a French dramatist, opera and ballet librettist. He wrote over forty librettos from 1893 to his death, for many of the most prominent composers of the Parisian Belle Epoque.

Cain was born in Paris, the son of the sculptor Auguste Cain and brother of the painter Georges Cain. He studied painting in the studios of Jean-Paul Laurens and Édouard Detaille.
He was married to the soprano Julia Guiraudon.

Close to Edouard de La Gandara, Jean Dara when he worked with Sarah Bernhardt, Henri Cain was an admirer of several major contemporary painters and sculptors such as Antonio de La Gandara and Jean Carriès.

Antar, with music by Gabriel Dupont can be heard on YouTube.

Operas (and ballets) to librettos by Henri Cain 

Benjamin Godard
La vivandière (1893)

Jules Massenet
La Navarraise (1894)
Sapho (1897)Cendrillon (1899)Cigale, ballet (1904)Chérubin (1905)Don Quichotte (1910)Roma (1912)

Camille ErlangerLe juif polonais (1900)Bacchus triomphant (1909)

André MessagerUne aventure de la Guimard, ballet in one act (1900)

Charles-Marie WidorLes pêcheurs de Saint-Jean (1906)

Umberto GiordanoMarcella (1909)

Henry FévrierAgnès dame galante (1912)Carmosine (1913)Gismonda (1919)

Franco AlfanoCirano di Bergerac (1936)

Jean NouguèsQuo Vadis (1908)

References

1857 births
1937 deaths
20th-century French non-fiction writers
20th-century French male writers
French opera librettists
French ballet librettists
Officiers of the Légion d'honneur
Writers from Paris
19th-century French dramatists and playwrights
Belle Époque